Moulton Escarpment is a rock and ice escarpment,  long, in a semi-isolated position about  west of Ford Massif where it forms the western shoulder of the Thiel Mountains in Antarctica. It was surveyed by the United States Geological Survey Thiel Mountains party of 1960–61, and was named by the Advisory Committee on Antarctic Names for Kendall N. Moulton of the Division of Polar Programs, National Science Foundation. As program manager of the Foundation's Field Operation Program, Moulton made more than a dozen deployments to Antarctica in the years 1958 to 1977.

References

Escarpments of Antarctica
Landforms of Ellsworth Land